Oxypilinae is a subfamily of the mantis family Hymenopodidae.

Tribes and genera
The Mantodea Species File lists:

Hestiasulini
Distribution: tropical Asia
 Astyliasula Schwarz & Shcherbakov, 2017
 Catestiasula Giglio-Tos, 1915
 Ephestiasula Giglio-Tos, 1915
 Hestiasula Saussure, 1871
 Pseudohestiasula Schwarz & Shcherbakov, 2017

Oxypilini
Distribution: Africa and tropical Asia
 Ceratomantis Wood-Mason, 1876
 Junodia Schulthess-Rechberg, 1899
 Oxypilus Serville, 1831
 Pachymantis Saussure, 1871
 Pseudoxypilus Giglio-Tos, 1915

References

Hymenopodidae
Mantodea subfamilies